José Ignacio Castro Mena (born 13 October 2001) is a Chilean professional footballer who plays as a left-back for Chilean Primera División side Universidad de Chile.

Club career
A left-back from the Universidad de Chile youth system, Castro made his professional debut in a 2021 Copa Libertadores match against San Lorenzo played in Argentina on 18 March, since the team had many players out in the context of COVID-19 pandemic. In March 2022, he signed his first professional contract.

References

External links
 
 José Castro at UdeChile.cl 

2001 births
Living people
Footballers from Santiago
Chilean footballers
Universidad de Chile footballers
Chilean Primera División players
Association football defenders